OAI may refer to:

 Object-action interface
 Office of American Innovation
 Omni Air International, a charter airline
 Open Archives Initiative, standards body
 Open Archives Initiative Protocol for Metadata Harvesting
 Open Archives Initiative Object Reuse and Exchange
 OAI, the IATA code of Bagram Airfield, Afghanistan

See also 
 Oai (disambiguation)